Uvais Mohamed Imitiyas was the Mayor of Colombo from 2006 to 2011. Imtiyas was an Auto rickshaw driver from an impoverished background who contested local government elections on an independent ticket. At that stage he had no realistic chance of being elected. However, technical electoral issues (proposing an underage candidate in the list) meant that the UNP candidates led by Sirisena Cooray could not contest the election. An agreement was reached to use the symbol of Imitiyas's group on the condition that he would renounce the seat if elected, allowing the UNP to appoint a mayor of their own choice. UNP led by Cooray campaigned for the independent group and they won under the spectacles symbol, but Imitiyas reneged on the agreement and remained in office, joining the ruling UPFA and did not stand for re-election.

References

External links
 Mayor Imitiyas facing one-man commission of inquiry in July 2007
 Past Mayors of Colombo (official site)
 Ex-mayor-now-a-chauffeur
 Colombo MC Jewel In The Crown, Kandy, Dehiwela – Mt Lavinia Close Behind

Living people
Mayors of Colombo
Year of birth missing (living people)